In the 1997–98 season, USM Alger competed in the Division 1 for the 22nd time They competed in Ligue 1, the Algerian Cup, the Algerian League Cup, the African Cup Winners' Cup, and the CAF Champions League. In the 1997–98 season witnessed the return of former coach Younes Ifticène who was behind the rise in the 1994–95 season, in 1997 CAF Champions League USMA participated for the first time a new copy of the competition Where they reached the group stage and in the last match against Primeiro de Agosto USM Alger won with a single goal that was not enough to qualify for the final after a major conflict with Moroccan club Raja Casablanca Which at the same time in South Africa scored the winning goal in the last minute and qualified for the final, In 1997–98 season Algerian Football Federation change league system to the groups USMA signed in the group B with strong teams such as ES Setif, JS Kabylie and MC Alger side managed to qualify for the final 3 points form JS Kabylie Then in the final against USM El Harrach at Stade du 5 Juillet 1962 USM Alger lost the title 2–3 after they advanced (2–0) 20 minutes before the end of the match to receive a full team of three goals, in the final minute USMA get a Penalty kick Its lost by defender Mounir Zeghdoud The Reds and Blacks ends the season without a title.

Squad list
Players and squad numbers last updated on 8 January 1998.Note: Flags indicate national team as has been defined under FIFA eligibility rules. Players may hold more than one non-FIFA nationality.

Competitions

Overview

Division 1

League table

Results summary

Results by round

Matches

Championship final

Algerian Cup

League Cup

Champions League

Group stage

African Cup Winners' Cup

First round

Squad information

Appearances and goals

|-

Goalscorers
Includes all competitive matches. The list is sorted alphabetically by surname when total goals are equal.

References

USM Alger seasons
Algerian football clubs 1997–98 season